Pajama Sam: No Need to Hide When It's Dark Outside (also known as Pajama Sam 1) is a 1996 children's adventure game originally released for PC and Mac. The first game of the Pajama Sam franchise, it sold nearly 3 million units and won 50 awards.

The game was first released on October 18, 1996. The game was reissued on December 7, 1999. In August 2008, the game was re-released as a Wii game by Majesco Entertainment renamed as Pajama Sam: Don't Fear The Dark, which was only available for a limited time due to legal problems concerning the port's development. This game was ported to iOS by Nimbus Games under the title Pajama Sam: No Need to Hide in December 2012. A Nintendo Switch version was released on February 10, 2022, followed by the PlayStation 4 version on the PlayStation Store in November.

Plot
The game begins with Sam (voiced by Pamela Segall Adlon) reading a comic book about his favorite superhero, Pajama Man, in bed, when his mom comes into the room to remind him that tonight is the night that he starts going to sleep with the lights off. Sam assures his mother that he is ready before she turns out the light and leaves the room. Sam suddenly realizes that he is afraid of the dark, but he takes inspiration from Pajama Man's bravery and dons a purple mask (his Pajama Sam Mask), takes a flashlight (his Illuminator Mark V Jr.) and his lunchbox (Portable Bad Guy Containment Unit) and enters his closet. Suddenly, Sam falls into a hole and ends up entering the Land of Darkness, a place where it is always nighttime.

Not long after he enters the Land of Darkness, a group of Customs Trees trap Sam with a rope and confiscate his superhero gear and mask. After Sam frees himself, a friendly female tree, to whom the rope belongs, lets Sam borrow her rope and encourages him to look for his missing items. He soon meets Otto, a German-accented wooden boat, who has Aquaphobia due to a friend telling him that another wooden boat sank in the water. Sam uses the rope to pull in a piece of wood (where he loses the rope, but the friendly tree doesn't hold a grudge) and tosses it into the river to show Otto that he doesn't need to be afraid. Otto finally conquers his fear of water and is able to be used as transportation for Sam around the river.

Sam also meets a depressed old mine cart named King, who got rusted to the mine tracks and isn't able to drive anymore. After finding a can of oil outside of an old shed, Sam uses the oil to get rid of the rust on King's wheels so he can be "King of the Tracks" again. Afterwards, King can be used as transportation for Sam around the Mines. After finding all his belongings, Sam is finally able to go confront Darkness.

Putting on his mask and getting his stuff ready, Sam enters Darkness' bedroom. After finding the key to Darkness' closet, Sam confronts Darkness, still being afraid of him. He soon realizes that Darkness is not all that bad and is just lonely because he has no one to play games with him. Feeling sorry for Darkness, he befriends him and they play "Cheese and Crackers" (a variation of Tic-tac-toe) together. Soon, Sam says that he has to go home before his mother finds out that he's missing and Darkness suggests that they play another game of Cheese and Crackers the next night, to which Sam agrees. When Sam goes back to his room, he jumps in his bed and falls asleep almost instantly after saying "good night" to Darkness as the game ends.

Multiple puzzles
The game is notable for its multiple game scenarios; when the player starts a new game, each of the three items that need to be collected are in one of either two locations (for example, sometimes the lunch box is next to a wishing well, and sometimes it is at the bottom of a river). In addition to this, the player needs to carry out different actions in order to retrieve these items (for example, to get the lunch box, the player must search the area for a magnet in order to pick up the box from the bottom of the river, but if the lunch box is placed next to the well, the player doesn't need the magnet and instead needs a set of boat oars to swim up a current). There are also two different locations for the mask (which is either being worn by a carrot or is hidden beneath a dancing couch in Darkness's house), as well as the flashlight (which is either in a hidden area of the mine or inside a shack near the river).

The player does not have control on which scenarios can be encountered in a playthrough, a feature that becomes available in subsequent sequels. There are also 10 pairs of socks that can be found throughout the Land of darkness.

Also, one of the questions for the Brain Tickler minigame is about the Land of Darkness. It will either ask what color the flowers are in Darkness' garden or what the number on the Mines' water meter is.

Development
Pajama Sam was displayed at the 1996 Electronic Entertainment Expo (E3) in June. A writer for Computer Games Strategy Plus noted that the character of Sam was "conceived as a pumpkin, [but ...] underwent design changes and now sports a realistic green head as he sets out with his PJ's, blankie, lunchbox and flashlight". The original pumpkin-head character design was later referenced in the third installment, Pajama Sam 3: You Are What You Eat From Your Head To Your Feet, where Sam must wear a hollowed-out jack-o-lantern over his head to gain access to a restricted area.

Reception

The original release of Pajama Sam received general acclaim, getting scores of 90% from GameRankings, 9/10 from IGN, 92% from Coming Soon Magazine, 9.5 out of 10 from Electric Playground, 8/10 from Unikgamer, 4 out of 5 stars from Allgame and 4 out of 5 stars from Adventure Gamers.

The 2008 Wii port, titled Pajama Sam: Don't Fear the Dark was praised for the ease of play with the Wii Remote, but the save-game framework was criticized for looking ugly and for autosaving at inopportune times, including overwriting save files after the player had passed a point of no return.

Legacy

Pajama Sam: No Need To Hide When It's Dark Outside spawned three sequels. The first, Pajama Sam 2: Thunder and Lightning Aren't so Frightening, was released in 1998. The following year, Pajama Sam 3: You Are What You Eat from Your Head to Your Feet was released, and was the final game with Pamela Segall Adlon voicing Pajama Sam. After Humongous Entertainment was purchased by Atari, Pajama Sam: Life Is Rough When You Lose Your Stuff! was released in 2003. The success of the game also resulted in a number of children's books being released between 1999 and 2001.

References

External links
 
 Pajama Sam In: No Need to Hide When It's Dark Outside at Humongous Entertainment

1996 video games
Android (operating system) games
Atari games
Children's educational video games
Children's games
Classic Mac OS games
Humongous Entertainment games
IOS games
Linux games
MacOS games
Majesco Entertainment games
Nintendo Switch games
Point-and-click adventure games
ScummVM-supported games
Single-player video games
Video games developed in the United States
Video games scored by Jeremy Soule
Video games using procedural generation
Wii games
Windows games
Tommo games
UFO Interactive Games games